Lawrence Adisa (born October 3, 1968) is an American actor, producer, and writer. Adisa is majorly known for Clockers (1995), New York Undercover, and 7th Heaven.

Biography
Adisa has appeared in films and many hit TV shows guest starring with Alan Alda (ER), Dick Van Dyke (Diagnosis Murder), Bill Cosby (Cosby Mysteries), Toni Braxton (Play'd A Hip Hop Story), and Regina King (NY Undercover) just to name a few. After landing a supporting role on the film Clockers directed by Spike Lee, Adisa went on to enjoy a steady career with numerous guest star TV roles. Off camera, he has written and produced feature films. The Warner Brothers released comedy, Grindin (2007) and The Love Section (2013) which appeared on BET and he produced BnB Hell (2017) which he appeared on.

Early life

Lawrence B. Adisa was born on October 3, 1968 in Mount Vernon, New York. Studying with the Black Filmmakers Foundation and HB Studios, he built his skills and confidence. His acting career began in 1992, taking roles in off-Broadway productions.

Career
Since 1994 Adisa has worked with a who's who in Hollywood both in front of and behind the camera. In 2016 Adisa launched his new production company, Lawrence Adisa Films, LLC. All present and future projects fall under the Lawrence Adisa Films, LLC umbrella.

Filmography

Actor
 2013 The Love Section as Ali Reese
 2012 The Mentalist(TV Series) as Morgue Attendant
 2011 Convincing Clooney as Lawrence
 2009 Raising the Bar (TV Series) as Rahim
 2008 Need for Speed: Undercover (Video Game) as Brad 'Nickel' Rogers
 2007 Starting from Scratch as Dylan
 2005 187 Ride or Die (Video Game) Crew
 2003 A Single Rose (Short) as Younger Owens
 2002 Play'd: A Hip Hop Story (TV Movie) asBangs
 1996–2001 NYPD Blue (TV Series) as Robert 'R.J.' Jenkins / Charlton Moody
 2000 The Hoop Life (TV Series) 
 2000 7th Heaven (TV Series) as Juror
 1999 Diagnosis Murder (TV Series) as Billy
 1999 ER (TV Series) as Josh's Cousin
 1998 Nash Bridges (TV Series) as Obediah Crow
 1997 Mad About You (TV Series) as Theresa's Boyfriend
 1997 L.A. Heat (TV Series) as Lemar
 1997 On the Line (TV Movie) as Carl
 1997 Pacific Blue (TV Series) as Ardel Means
 1997 NewsRadio (TV Series) as Three Card Monte Dealer
 1994–1996 New York Undercover (TV Series) as Leroy Green / Ray
 1995 Clockers as Stan
 1994 The Cosby Mysteries (TV Series) as Three-Card-Monte Dealer

Producer
 2017 BnB HELL (producer) 
 2013 The Love Section (producer)
 2007 Grindin' (executive producer) / (producer)

Writer
 2013 The Love Section
 2007 Grindin'

References/Notes and references

External links 

1968 births
20th-century American male actors
21st-century American male actors
African-American male actors
American male film actors
American male stage actors
American male television actors
African-American television producers
Living people
20th-century African-American people
21st-century African-American people